The women's singles squash  competition at the 2017 World Games took place from 25 to 28 July 2017 at the Hasta La Vista Squash Center in Wrocław, Poland.

Competition format
A total of 31 athletes entered the competition. Players competed in classic cup system.

Seeds

Results

References 

Squash at the 2017 World Games
2017 World Games